Frederick W. Lauer (October 13, 1898 – December 17, 1960) was an American water polo player who competed in the 1924 Summer Olympics, in the 1932 Summer Olympics, and in the 1936 Summer Olympics.

In 1924 he was part of the American team which won the bronze medal. He played all five matches as goalkeeper. Eight years later he was a squad member of the American team which won the bronze medal again. He did not participate in a match and was not awarded with a medal. In 1936 he was eliminated in the first round with the American team. He played one match as goalkeeper.

In 1979, he was inducted into the USA Water Polo Hall of Fame.

See also
 List of Olympic medalists in water polo (men)
 List of men's Olympic water polo tournament goalkeepers

References

External links
 

1898 births
1960 deaths
American male water polo players
Water polo goalkeepers
Olympic bronze medalists for the United States in water polo
Water polo players at the 1924 Summer Olympics
Water polo players at the 1932 Summer Olympics
Water polo players at the 1936 Summer Olympics
Medalists at the 1924 Summer Olympics